KQSS (101.9 FM, "Gila 101.9") is a radio station licensed to serve Miami, Arizona, United States. The station is licensed to Rollye and Jon Cornell, through licensee Globecasting, Inc. It airs a country music format.

The station was assigned the KQSS call letters by the Federal Communications Commission on August 8, 1984.

References

External links
 KQSS official website
 

QSS
Country radio stations in the United States
Mass media in Gila County, Arizona